State Route 96 (SR 96) is an east–west state highway in the northern portion of the U.S. state of Ohio. Its eastern terminus is at an interchange with US 42 and US 250 in the eastern portion of Ashland.

Route description
SR 96 passes through the counties of Crawford, Richland and Ashland.  There are no stretches of the highway that are included within the National Highway System, a system of highways identified as being most pertinent for the economy, mobility and defense of the nation.

History
1923 marked the year in which SR 96 was established.  Originally, the highway consisted of the majority of what its easternmost stretch today, running between downtown Shelby and downtown Ashland.  A westward extension of SR 96 happened in 1939.  This extension followed the existing SR 96 west out of Shelby, along with what is now Crawford County Road 45 (Stetzer Road) west-southwesterly to a new western terminus in the eastern end of Bucyrus at Old Lincoln Highway, which at the time designated as US 30N.

In 1971, coinciding with the completion of the US 30N (now mainline US 30) freeway bypass of Bucyrus, SR 96 was re-routed onto its present alignment through eastern Crawford County to its current western terminus at SR 98 northeast of Bucyrus.  Jurisdiction of the former alignment into Bucyrus was turned back to Crawford County, which designated it as County Road 45.  Then, by 1992, SR 96 was extended slightly on the eastern end.  With the re-routing of US 250 onto a northern bypass of Ashland that tied with the US 42 eastern bypass of the city, SR 96 was extended into the eastern end of Ashland along the former routing of US 250 to a new eastern terminus where US 250 re-joined its former alignment at the US 42 interchange (now a signalized intersection).

Major intersections

References

External links

096
Transportation in Ashland County, Ohio
Transportation in Crawford County, Ohio
Transportation in Richland County, Ohio